The American Bridge Company is a heavy/civil construction firm that specializes in building and renovating bridges and other large, complex structures. Founded in 1900, the company is headquartered in Coraopolis, Pennsylvania, a suburb of Pittsburgh. The firm has built many bridges in the U.S. and elsewhere; the Historic American Engineering Record notes at least 81. American Bridge has also built or helped build the Willis Tower, the Empire State Building, the Chrysler Building, launch pads, resorts, and more. During World War II, it produced tank landing ships (LSTs) for the United States Navy. In 2020, American Bridge Company was acquired by Southland Holdings LLC.

History

American Bridge Company was founded in April 1900, when J.P. Morgan & Co. led a consolidation of 28 of the largest U.S. steel fabricators and constructors. The company's roots extend to the late 1860s, when one of the consolidated firms, Keystone Bridge Company, built the Eads Bridge at St. Louis, the first steel bridge over the Mississippi River and still in use. In 1902, the company became a subsidiary of United States Steel as part of the Steel Trust consolidation.

The company pioneered the use of steel as a construction material; developing the means and methods for fabrication and construction that allowed it to be widely used in buildings, bridges, vessels, and other plate applications. It went on to do work across the nation and around the world.

During World War II, the company built warships for the U.S. Navy. In 1944, American painter Thomas Hart Benton recorded the construction and launch of LST 768, producing numerous drawings and a painting, Cut the Line.

The company went private in 1987 and was sold to Continental Engineering Corporation in 1988.

The town of Ambridge, Pennsylvania, was an American Bridge company town (thus the name "Ambridge"), and is near their current headquarters of Coraopolis, Pennsylvania. Both municipalities are on the Ohio River near Pittsburgh, with access to many steel suppliers, as well as to waterborne and rail transport, to allow shipment of components and subassemblies.

Notable projects
 This is a representative list, not an exhaustive one.

Bridges
 1908 Puente Negro, Culiacan, México
 1926 Hercilio Luz Bridge, Florianópolis, Brazil
 1927 Silver Bridge, Point Pleasant, West Virginia
 1936 Bay Bridge, Oakland, California
 1939 Exchange Street Bridge, Athol, Massachusetts
 1957 Mackinac Bridge, Mackinac Straits, Michigan
 1961 Puente Hermanos Patiño, Santiago, Dominican Republic
 1964 Verrazano-Narrows Bridge, New York Harbor
 1997 Macarthur Causeway, Miami, Florida
 2017 Genesee Arch Bridge, Letchworth State Park, Portageville, New York

Built the longest concrete segmental cable stay bridge in the United States:
 1986 Sunshine Skyway Bridge, Tampa Bay, Florida

Built the longest suspension bridge in South America, and one of the longest in Europe:

 1967 Orinoco Bridge, Venezuela
 1966 April 25 Bridge, Lisbon, Portugal

Built the world's longest arch bridge on three occasions:

 1977 New River Gorge Bridge, West Virginia, 518 meters, (1,700’)
 1932 Bayonne Bridge, Staten Island-New Jersey, 504 meters (1,652’)
 1916 Hell Gate Bridge, New York City, 298 meters (978’)

Built the world's longest self-supporting continuous truss bridge:

 1966 Astoria Bridge, Oregon, 376 meters (1,232’)

Renovations of existing bridges:

 1995 Moved an existing Norfolk Southern vertical lift bridge from Florence, Alabama, to Hannibal, Missouri,
 1998 First aerial spinning for additional main cables on a loaded, fully operational suspension bridge. April 25 Bridge in Lisbon, Portugal
 2001 First stiffening truss replacement on a loaded, fully operational suspension bridge. Lions Gate Bridge, Vancouver, British Columbia, Canada
 2002 Eastern span replacement of the San Francisco–Oakland Bay Bridge, in a joint venture with Fluor Corporation, American Bridge-Fluor.

Buildings

Built the world's tallest building on numerous occasions.

 1930 Chrysler Building, New York City
 1930 Woolworth Building, New York City
 1932 Empire State Building, New York City
 1974 Willis Tower, Chicago

Built many other well-known buildings.
 1902 Flatiron Building, New York City
 1969 John Hancock Center, Chicago
 1969 John Hancock Tower, Boston
 1971 U.S. Steel Tower, Pittsburgh
 1971 Disney's Contemporary Resort, Orlando
 1973 Aon Center, Chicago
 1975 Columbia Center, Seattle

Built the world's largest building by volume twice.
 1966 Vehicle Assembly Building, Titusville
 1967 Boeing Everett Factory, Everett

Built two of the most notable domed stadium structures in the world

 1964 Houston Astrodome
 1974 Louisiana Superdome

Miscellaneous
Space launch complex jacking for McDonnell Douglas Astronautics (now Boeing) (1994) 
Built bottom framework for the unique, modular room units for Walt Disney Company at the Contemporary Resort in Walt Disney World (1971).
Hammerhead Crane, 350ton Cantilever type,  (Norfolk Naval Shipyard), (1940)
Hunters Point Gantry Crane, world's largest, 460 ton capacity,  (Hunters Point Naval Shipyard), (1947)
Matterhorn Bobsleds in Disneyland, the steel structure inside the mountain, used 2,175 steel pieces.

See also
Cardwell v. American Bridge Co.
Continental Engineering Corporation

Notes

External links

Company information
Hoovers fact sheet on ABC

Projects and history
HAER record of at least 81 ABC bridges/projects
American Bridge Company Chronological history from the company site
Old Economy Village history page with American Bridge Company history.
News article on American Bridge legacy
Another article on legacy.

Construction and civil engineering companies of the United States
Construction and civil engineering companies established in 1900
Bridge companies
1900 establishments in Pennsylvania
American companies established in 1900